Walter George "Wally" Pesuit (born March 4, 1954) is a former American football offensive and defensive lineman in the National Football League for the Atlanta Falcons, Miami Dolphins and Detroit Lions. He played college football at the University of Kentucky.

Early years
Pesuit attended Wintersville High School, where he was an All-state offensive tackle, a wrestling and weight-lifter champion in the Ohio Valley Conference. He also practiced the discus throw and the shot put.

He accepted a football scholarship from the University of Kentucky. He was named a starter at offensive guard as a sophomore. He was named the starter at left tackle as a junior. He was co-captain and the starting left tackle as a senior.

Professional career

Dallas Cowboys
Pesuit was selected by the Dallas Cowboys in the fifth round (151st overall) of the 1976 NFL Draft, with the intention of playing him at the defensive line. He was waived on August 23.

Atlanta Falcons
He was claimed off waivers by the Atlanta Falcons who used him at defensive end. On November 3, 1976, he was released after one game to make room for linebacker Jim Cope.

Miami Dolphins
On December 6, 1976, he was signed by the Miami Dolphins. He was a backup who played different positions along the offensive line. He was cut on August 21, 1979.

Detroit Lions
Pesuit was claimed off waivers by the Detroit Lions to replace Larry Tearry who abruptly left the team. That season, he started 5 games at center. He was released on August 26, 1980. He was later re-signed during the season and released on November 6, to make room for Rod Walters.

Chicago Blitz (USFL)
In 1983, he signed with the Chicago Blitz of the United States Football League.

Jacksonville Bulls
The Jacksonville Bulls selected him from the Chicago Blitz roster in the 1983 USFL Expansion Draft. In 1984, Pesuit played all 18 games as the Bulls' long snapper and a reserve offensive lineman.

Personal life
His father Walter V., played for the Cleveland Rams in the National Football League as a 5-8 halfback in 1938.

References

1954 births
Living people
Sportspeople from Steubenville, Ohio
Players of American football from Ohio
American football centers
American football offensive guards
American football offensive tackles
Kentucky Wildcats football players
Atlanta Falcons players
Miami Dolphins players
Detroit Lions players
Chicago Blitz players
Jacksonville Bulls players